The first season of Dancing with the Stars Myanmar was broadcast on MRTV-4 starting on October 27, 2019. Twelve celebrities were paired with twelve professional ballroom dancers. Kaung Htet Zaw and La Won Htet were the hosts for this season. The judges were Ian, Jimmy Ko Ko, and Khine Lay.

The season finale aired February 3, 2020, with the winners of the season being singer and actress Nant Chit Nadi Zaw and her dance partner Tae Min.

Couples
The twelve professionals and celebrities that competed were:

References

Dancing with the Stars
2019 television seasons
2020 television seasons